Frank Parsons may refer to:

 Frank Parsons (Australian soccer), retired Australian footballer
 Frank Parsons (English footballer) (born 1947), retired English footballer (Crystal Palace and Cardiff City)
 Frank Parsons (social reformer) (1854–1908), lawyer, professor, and public intellectual; regarded as father of vocational guidance movement
 Frank Parsons Jr. (1906–1957), American sports shooter
 Frank Alvah Parsons, president of the New York School of Art
 Frank Nesmith Parsons (1854–1934), lawyer, politician, and Chief Justice of the New Hampshire Supreme Court

See also
Francis Parsons (disambiguation)